The Elizabeth City Micropolitan Statistical Area, as defined by the United States Census Bureau, is an area consisting of two counties in the Inner Banks region of eastern North Carolina, anchored by the area of Elizabeth City. It is part of a bigger Virginia Beach-Norfolk, VA-NC Combined Statistical Area.

As of the 2010 census, the Micropolitan Statistical Area had a population of 64,094.

Counties
Pasquotank
Perquimans

Communities
Belvidere (unincorporated)
Camden
Elizabeth City (Principal city)
Hertford
Nixonton (unincorporated)
Morgan's Corner
Weeksville (unincorporated)
Winfall
Woodville (unincorporated)

Demographics
As of the census of 2014, there were 64,754 people, 24,229 households, and 17,120 families residing within the μSA. The racial makeup of the USA was 63.9% White, 31.2% African American, 0.3% Native American, 1.0% Asian, 0.0% Pacific Islander, 1.5% from other races, and 2.0% from two or more races. Hispanic or Latino of any race were 3.3% of the population.

The median income for a household in the USA was $33,158, and the median income for a family was $39,000. Males had a median income of $31,199 versus $21,752 for females. The per capita income for the USA was $16,408.

See also
North Carolina census statistical areas

References 

 
Geography of Camden County, North Carolina
Geography of Pasquotank County, North Carolina
Geography of Perquimans County, North Carolina